Black Mamba (Tanya Sealy) is a supervillain appearing in American comic books published by Marvel Comics. She first appeared in Marvel Two-in-One #64 (June 1980) created by writers Mark Gruenwald and Ralph Macchio. The character is most closely associated as a founding member of both the Serpent Society and BAD Girls, Inc. but has also been a member of the Masters of Evil, the Femizons and the Women Warriors.

Publication history
Black Mamba first appeared in Marvel Two-in-One #64-65 (June–July 1980), and was created by Mark Gruenwald and Ralph Macchio.  Black Mamba received an entry in the original Official Handbook of the Marvel Universe #2, and The Official Handbook of the Marvel Universe Deluxe Edition #2.

Fictional character biography
Tanya Sealy was born in Chicago. A former call girl, she was chosen under unknown circumstances by Roxxon Oil Company to partake in a covert operation to retrieve the mystical Serpent Crown. The executives at Roxxon had a device surgically implanted in Sealy's brain which granted her superhuman abilities. Working together with three other snake-themed villains, Sidewinder, Anaconda, and Death Adder, she became a founding member of the Serpent Squad. During her first mission, Black Mamba nearly overcame the Fantastic Four's Thing, but was defeated.  She also encountered Iron Man while searching for a powerful weapon known as the microscanner.

Invited by Sidewinder to join his criminal organization, the Serpent Society, Black Mamba accepted. Before working with Roxxon, she was a call-girl, and while the money was satisfying, it was not a steady income, so she jumped at the opportunity to earn vast amounts of money with Sidewinder. While in the Serpent Society, Black Mamba gained great friendships in Diamondback and Asp, and also became romantically involved with Sidewinder. During Viper's infiltration of the group, Black Mamba stood loyally with Sidewinder, which Viper was ready to kill her for. When Diamondback turned over a new leaf, it sparked something in Black Mamba. She joined her friends Diamondback and Asp in forming BAD Girls, Inc. and worked several mercenary-for-hire missions. She also briefly served in Superia's all-female group, the Femizons, but betrayed the group to aid Captain America and Paladin.

For some time, Black Mamba served in Crimson Cowl's Masters of Evil in hopes of a large profit, battling the Thunderbolts. She eventually went back to the Serpent Society. She also fought Luke Cage and Iron Fist, and was shocked to realize her group had been hired by Cable himself.

During the "Civil War" storyline, Black Mamba appears along with her friends Diamondback and Asp as a member of Captain America's anti-registration group. She took part in the final battle of the "war", but did not accept the offer of amnesty that came with Captain America's surrender.

Later, Black Mamba and the other BAD Girls were captured by The Mighty Avengers in a New York City street mall. She escaped captivity and was later seen with several other villains in "The Bar With No Name".

In "Secret Invasion," Black Mamba rejoined the Serpent Society. The Society held a number of civilians hostage in a compound in the American Midwest claiming they were protecting themselves from the Skrulls. However, they were easily defeated by Nova and his new Nova Corps.

Later, several Serpent Society members including Anaconda, Black Mamba, Bushmaster and Cottonmouth, fought members of the New Avengers in a semi-tropical locale. She was defeated by Captain America.

During the "Dark Reign" storyline, Black Mamba is revealed as a member of the Initiative's new team for the state of Delaware, the Women Warriors.

Black Mamba is one of the assassins tasked by the Assassins Guild to collect the bounty on Domino's head. She attempts to use her powers on Wolverine, causing him to perceive Mariko. She is later stabbed in the chest by X-23, but ultimately healed by Elixir, albeit to Wolverine's chagrin.

As part of the "All-New, All-Different Marvel" event, Black Mamba appears as a member of Viper's Serpent Society under its new name Serpent Solutions.

During the "Opening Salvo" part of the "Secret Empire" storyline, Black Mamba was with Serpent Solutions at the time when they are recruited by Baron Helmut Zemo to join his Army of Evil.

Black Mamba was next seen once again alongside the Assassins Guild as they attacked Deadpool. During the battle, Black Mamba was electrocuted by one of Deadpool's gadgets, incapacitating her and several other villains.

In a prelude to the "Hunted" storyline, several members of the Serpent Society were captured by Kraven the Hunter, Taskmaster, and Black Ant and forced to participate in a murderous hunt set up by Arcade. Black Mamba, Cottonmouth, Bushmaster, Black Racer, Puff Adder, Rock Python, and Fer-de-Lance were placed in electric cages to wait for the hunt to commence. Black Mamba and Cottonmouth talked about their opinion that Viper is not suited to lead the Serpent Society. They are saved from the Hunter-Bots by Vulture.

Powers and abilities
Black Mamba possesses two separate superhuman abilities which she most often uses in tandem for a unique result. Her powers are both presumably the result of a cranial implant given to her by Roxxon.

Black Mamba has limited telepathic abilities that allow her to scan the minds of others nearby. The extent of her telepathy is unrevealed; it is unknown if she possesses other abilities possessed by most telepaths, such as mental communication. She uses this power to extract and project illusions of loved ones into her victims' minds while placing her target in a sedated trance-like state in which they are fixated upon the mental image she has created.

Mamba's second ability allows her to generate a cloud of tangible Darkforce energy that she uses to ensnare her victim, constricting them with potentially fatal force. The victim, however, is unaware, and views the Darkforce energy as the loved one she has projected into their mind. Trapped in Mamba's ecstatic trance, the victim is completely unaware that they are being strangled and can die in minutes. Mamba can generate Darkforce without first using her telepathic power on an opponent, but with much less efficiency as the target is aware and can avoid the relatively slow-moving Darkforce cloud easier. The full extent of Mamba's control over Darkforce energy has not been revealed. She can also use her Darkforce to surround herself, disguising herself as whomever she wishes to look like. She can use this ability on others, though the field begins to dissipate when it leaves her sight.

Beings with sufficient willpower can break free of Mamba's telepathic grasp, and physical attacks of sufficient force can dispel her Darkforce manifestations. Because of this, Black Mamba usually employs her powers on those who are unaware of her presence.

Other versions

Ultimate Marvel
Black Mamba appears in the Ultimate Marvel universe as a member of the Serpent Squad, a group of female mercenaries. After having the Serpent Crown stolen from them, they battle the Fantastic Four. Black Mamba was knocked out of the fight by the Thing early on, and was taken into custody. After the Thing called the Serpent Squad "freaks" in passing, Black Mamba retaliated in anger by saying he would die alone because he is so sickening.  Black Mamba's Ultimate design closely resembles her Earth-616 design, but it is unknown if she commands the darkforce in this alternate universe. Oddly enough, her real name seems to have been changed to "Janis".

Marvel Zombies
During the "Secret Wars" storyline, a zombified version of Black Mamba appeared in the Marvel Zombies universe as an inhabitant of the Battleworld domain of the Deadlands.

In other media
Black Mamba appeared in the Marvel Future Avengers anime television series episode "Mission Black Market Auction", voiced by Hana Takeda in Japanese and Colleen O'Shaughnessey in English. A member of B.A.D. Girls, Inc., this version is hired alongside Asp and Diamondback to guard a cruise ship where an illegal auction for a powerful weapon is to take place. However, they are defeated by Wasp, Black Widow, and Charade.

References

External links
 

Characters created by Mark Gruenwald
Characters created by Ralph Macchio
Comics characters introduced in 1980
Fictional characters from Chicago
Fictional characters who can manipulate darkness or shadows
Fictional mercenaries in comics
Fictional prostitutes
Marvel Comics female superheroes
Marvel Comics female supervillains
Marvel Comics mutates
Marvel Comics telepaths
Prostitution in comics